Khvilisha Church is an 8th- or, more likely, 9th-century Georgian Orthodox church located along the southern outskirts and side of the main road through the village of Aspindza in the Aspindza Municipality and Samtskhe-Javakheti province of Georgia.  The church was renovated in the 1970s, where collapsed portions of upper walls and a missing vault were reconstructed.

References 

Archaeological sites in Georgia (country)
Buildings and structures in Samtskhe–Javakheti
9th-century churches in Georgia (country)